The 2022 Málaga Open was a professional tennis tournament played on hard courts. It was the first edition of the tournament which was part of the 2022 ATP Challenger Tour. It took place in Málaga, Spain between 27 June and 3 July 2022.

Singles main draw entrants

Seeds

 1 Rankings as of 20 June 2022.

Other entrants
The following players received wildcards into the singles main draw:
  Alberto Barroso Campos
  Daniel Mérida
  Bernard Tomic

The following player received entry into the singles main draw using a protected ranking:
  Roberto Marcora

The following players received entry into the singles main draw as alternates:
  Nicolás Álvarez Varona
  Steven Diez
  Kaichi Uchida

The following players received entry from the qualifying draw:
  Yuki Bhambri
  Daniel Cukierman
  Gabriel Décamps
  Marek Gengel
  Alibek Kachmazov
  James McCabe

Champions

Singles 

  Constant Lestienne def.  Emilio Gómez 6–3, 5–7, 6–2.

Doubles 

  Altuğ Çelikbilek /  Dmitry Popko def.  Daniel Cukierman /  Emilio Gómez 6–7(4–7), 6–4, [10–6].

References

Málaga Open
Málaga Open
June 2022 sports events in Spain
July 2022 sports events in Spain